Joseph Chambers may refer to:

 Joseph Chambers (minister) (born 1936), Pentecostal minister and writer
 Joseph Chambers (politician) (1815–1884), Australian politician
 Joseph B. Chambers (1833–1909), American soldier and Medal of Honor recipient
 Joseph Bernard Chambers (1859–1931), New Zealand sheepfarmer, viticulturist and wine-maker
 Joseph N. Chambers, American politician and army officer
 Joe Chambers (born 1942), American jazz drummer
 Joe Chambers (basketball) (born 1982), American wheelchair basketball player